Mahjong tiles are tiles of Chinese origin that are used to play mahjong as well as mahjong solitaire and other games.  Although they are most commonly tiles, they may refer to playing cards with similar contents as well.

Development 

The earliest surviving mahjong sets date to the 1870s when the game was largely confined to Zhejiang, Shanghai, and Jiangsu. They already exhibited various traits found in modern sets. The core of the set is the 108 suited tiles which were inherited from Chinese money-suited playing cards. The Wind honor tiles and the Four Seasons tiles were also found in the earliest sets. The honor tiles known as Arrows (Dragons in English) developed to their current form by 1890 concurrent with a new style of play called Zhōngfā (中發). Flower tiles, once known as Outer Flowers, were not universally accepted until the 1920s. In contrast, many early sets contained wild cards with specific powers known as Inner Flowers which disappeared from most of China but are still found in Vietnam and Thailand.

Contents 

A set of Mahjong tiles will usually differ from place to place. It usually has at least 136 tiles (four copies of each of the Suit and Honor Tiles), most commonly 144, although sets originating from the United States or Southeast Asia will usually feature more tiles in the form of flowers or Jokers. Some sets also contain blank tiles which owners can use to replace damaged or missing tiles.

Mahjong tiles can be organized into several categories:

Suited tiles 
Suited tiles (also ; also ) have a suit and a rank. There are three money-based suits with ranks ranging from one to nine. There are four tiles of each rank and suit combination, thus there are 36 tiles in a suit, and 108 suited tiles in total.  To refer to a suited tile, the rank is named, followed by the suit. The ones and nines of each suit are collectively referred to as the terminal tiles. Suited tiles may be used to form melds.

Circles 
The circle (dot, coin, wheel, stone) suit (also ) is represented by a series of circles.

The 1 Circle is generally a large circle of multiple colors, while the rest of the circle tiles consist of smaller circles, each circle being of one color.  The 2 Circle consists of a green and a blue circle, the 3 consisting of one green, one red, and one blue circle arranged diagonally (the order the circles appear in, as well as the orientation, differs between sets).  The 4 Circle has two blue circles and two green circles, arranged in a rectangle with circles of like color in opposite corners.  The 5 Circle is similar to the 4 Circle, with another circle (its color depending on the set) in the middle.  The 6 Circle consists of two green circles at the top and four red circles in the bottom (with a space between the green and red circles). The 7 Circle is similar to the 6 Circle, but has 3 green circles arranged diagonally from top-left to bottom-right.  The 8 Circle has eight blue circles arranged in a 2x4 rectangle.  The 9 Circle has three each of green, red, and blue circles, with each color occupying a row. There is some space between each row, and the middle row is always of the red circles (the blue and green, of course, depends on the orientation of the tile).

Because of the large size of the circle in the 1 Circle, it is commonly nicknamed da bing (大餅 pinyin dàbǐng, literally: "big pancake").

From the monetary origin of this suit, the circles represent the copper coins known in English as "cash". (1銅=one copper coin).

Bamboo 

The bamboo (stick, string, bam) suit (also ), with the exception of the 1 Bamboo, which is commonly represented by a bird (like ,  or ), is represented by outlines of sticks.

 or

The 2, 3, 4, 6, and 8 Bamboo are represented entirely out of green sticks only or blue and green sticks, while the middle stick in the 5 Bamboo, the top stick of the 7 Bamboo, and the sticks along the center column of the 9 Bamboo are red. Some sets may also have the sticks along the bottom row or center column of the 7 Bamboo in blue. The 8 Bamboo has its sticks forming an M-shape and its mirror image.

From the monetary origin of this suit, the sticks are actually rope strings (索) that tie 100 Chinese copper coins together by the square holes in the middle. (1索=100銅) The repeated bumps in the sticks depict the individual coins in the strings, but they were mistaken by Joseph Park Babcock as the knots on the bamboo plants, hence the English name of the suit. The 1 Bamboo, as it commonly depicts a bird, is often referred as the sparrow (麻雀 - má què); in Japan it is most commonly a peacock. In early sets, there was no bird but a single bent string of cash capped with a red knot.

Characters 

The character (myriad, number, crack) suit is represented by Chinese characters.

The rank of the tile is represented at the top, in blue, with Chinese numerals, while the character below (萬 wàn, meaning myriad) is in red. Older sets used the cursive character 万 when tiles were still hand-carved. Fujianese sets use 品 (pǐn, rank). Most sets use the character 伍 for five instead of 五.

From the monetary origin of this suit, the myriads (10,000) are actually 100 strings of coins described in the bamboo suit section above.  One myriad equals ten thousand coins or 100 strings of 100 coins. (1萬=100索×100銅)

Red tiles 
Red tiles are unique to the Japanese set. They appear as a red version of tiles from each suit and are not quadruplicated. They first appeared in the 1970s with the Red 5 Circle which were followed with red 5 tiles for the other suits. Red 3s and 7s later appeared and were followed by red 1s and 9s although they are much less commonly found in sets than red 5s. There is also a rare red white dragon (白ポッチ, shiro pocchi) which can act as a wild card if tsumo conditions are met.

 These tiles are entirely optional. When inserted into play, one copy of its regular non-red counterpart is removed. They increase the score when melded. Japanese sets typically do not include the Four Gentlemen flower tiles to make room for the red tiles as flower tiles are rarely used in Japanese Mahjong anyway. Some mahjong parlours will have their own house tiles which may be red tiles for even ranks, even higher-scoring green tiles or gold tiles, or colored wind tiles.

Honor tiles 
Honor tiles (字牌, pinyin: zìpái, Japanese romaji: jihai, meaning 'word tiles'; or  番子, jyutping: faan1zi2, 'exponentials') have neither rank nor suit but like suited tiles they are also formed into melds. They are divided into two categories: four Wind tiles (風牌/风牌, pinyin: fēngpái, jyutping: fung1paai2, Japanese romaji: fompai or kazehai) and three Dragon tiles (三元牌, pinyin: sānyuánpái, jyutping: saam1jyun4paai2, Japanese romaji: sangempai), each of which is quadruplicated. Thus, there are 16 wind tiles and 12 Dragon tiles for 28 honor tiles.

Winds 
The four types of Wind tiles are:

 East,
 South,
 West, and
 North.

Their Chinese characters are usually in blue, like 東, 南, 西 and 北.

Each type of Wind tiles corresponds to a point along the compass, written in blue traditional Chinese characters (even for sets where the Character tiles are written in simplified Chinese). Bonus points are scored if melds match the seat wind or prevailing wind or both. They are also known as the Four Joyous Tiles.

Dragons 
The three types of Dragon tiles are:

 or
 or

 Red (also ) - a tile with a red traditional Chinese character (中) meaning center or middle. Sets for English speakers may also have a black letter C in a corner of the tile, denoting the first letter of the Wade-Giles romanization of 中 (chung). One of the earliest sets did not include these tiles. Some tiles have the traditional Chinese character "龍" or a red dragon icon.
 Green (also ; also ) - a tile with a green traditional Chinese character (發), even for sets where the Character tiles are written in simplified Chinese. Often the variant character U+24F35 𤼵 (癶 over 弓矢 instead of 弓殳) is used. It is a contraction of 發財/发财 (pinyin: fā cái) which loosely means "to strike it rich"). Some sets, notably American, use a green dragon in place of the character or may also have a black letter F in a corner of the tile, denoting the first letter from its transliteration. This tile was absent in the earliest sets. Some tiles have the traditional Chinese character "鳳" or a green dragon icon.
 White (also ) - a tile which can be without any markings like , although most modern sets employ tiles with a blue border (like  or ) to distinguish them from replacement tiles. Anglophone sets may also have a black letter B in the center of the tile, denoting the first letter of the Wade-Giles romanization of 白 (bai). Japanese tiles of this kind have no mark on them, and are occasionally dubbed tofu (bean curd) in some Japanese mahjong clubs. As noted above, there is a Japanese red tile version.

The Chinese name for the Dragon tiles means "three fundamental tiles" (三元牌). They are also known as the arrow tiles (箭牌). The English name ("Dragons") was an invention by Babcock. They are like wind tiles except melding them will always score bonus points regardless of the prevailing or seat wind. These tiles were invented after the wind tiles beginning with the whites which were developed from replacement tiles, followed by the reds circa 1870, and finally the greens which entered the set by 1890.

Chinese characters occur in the design of the Characters, the Winds and the Dragons. Regular script (楷書) is usually used in the areas of Hong Kong, Taiwan, Canton, China and Southeast Asia, while Semi-cursive script (行書) is usually used in Japan.

Flower tiles 
Flower tiles are not used in melds. When drawn, they are set aside and the player gets to draw again but from the dead wall. These tiles usually depict stylized representations of flowers in many colors (hence the name). Nevertheless, other non-floral themes also exist, which vary from set to set. In American Mahjong, they are treated as honor tiles but from the 1930s to 1960 they were considered jokers. Some Japanese players treat them as higher scoring honors that cannot be used to form 'eyes' (pairs). Generally, however, they are not used in Japanese mahjong.

Quartets 
The average set, if it contains flower tiles, will have two quartets of flower tiles, differentiating the color and/or style of the labels. Each quartet contains four unique tiles, which are numbered from 1 to 4 or otherwise distinctly labelled (common Chinese sets will have one quartet with blue Arabic numerals and the other group having red Chinese numerals). Each number matches a seat (1=East, 2=South, 3=West, 4=North).  Winners can double their score if the number on their flowers matches their seat number. There are also bonuses from collecting an entire quartet and in some variations, immediately winning from collecting all the flowers. As they reward points for pure luck, many games do not include them or are considered optional.

The four tiles in the Four Seasons quartet are:

 Spring 
 Summer 
 Autumn 
 Winter 

The four tiles in the Four Gentlemen quartet are:

 plum 
 orchid 
 chrysanthemum 
 bamboo 

Thai, Vietnamese, and Malaysian mahjong sets contain two more quartets of flower tiles in addition to the Four Seasons and Four Gentlemen. These are the usual subjects:

Four Arts: 1. Guqin (琴), 2. Go (棋), 3. Calligraphy (書), 4. Painting (畫)
 
Four Noble Professions: 1. Fisher (漁), 2. Woodcutter (樵), 3. Farmer (耕), 4. Scholar (讀)
 

While some Vietnamese sets use the Four Arts and the Four Noble Professions, most of them use emperors and empresses. They are not decorated with pictures but just the number and character (e.g. Third Emperor 三皇, Fourth Empress 四后).

The earliest known Chinese sets contained twelve flowers but no Four Gentlemen tiles and the Four Seasons were unadorned. Sets with large numbers of flowers were once popular in Northern China to play the game of "Flower Mahjong" (花麻雀). They typically had 20 or more flowers with some described as having up to 44.

Animal tiles 
Animal tiles are unnumbered flowers that automatically match the player's seat. These tiles are found in pairs with their subjects usually based on popular Chinese fables. Immediate payment occurs if both tiles in a pair or all the animals are collected. Singaporean sets contain two pairs of animal tiles while Thai and four-player Malaysian sets have four pairs. Some examples of tile pairs include:

 Cat & Mouse
 Rooster & Centipede
 Caishen (the god of wealth in Chinese folk religion and Taoism) & Sycee (an ancient, custom-made gold or silver ingot)
 Jiang Ziya (an 11th-century BC military strategist who, according to legend, fished without bait, believing the fish would come on their own) & Fish
 Liu Haichan (a legendary Taoist immortal) & Jin Chan (a mythical three-legged toad that attracts wealth)
 Dragon & Flaming pearl (a legendary treasure said to grant wishes)

Three-player Malaysian sets have two pairs of animals accompanied with a quartet of identical animal tiles decorated with a face, usually that of a clown. These are known as heads (人头), faces (人臉), clowns (小丑) or snowmen (雪人).  Sometimes, these four heads will be replaced with two pairs of male heads (male clowns, male faces) and female heads (female clowns, female faces).

 or

Joker tiles 

Joker tiles (百搭牌, pinyin bǎidāpái) can be used to replace any suited or honor tile in putting together a hand subject to local restrictions. Four jokers are sometimes used in certain variants of Southeast Asian and Chinese mahjong, including Shanghainese mahjong. American mahjong uses eight jokers.

General-purpose 
All-purpose jokers may have these inscriptions: 百搭 (bǎidā, 'hundred uses'), 聽用 (tīngyòng, 'many uses'), 飛 (fēi, 'flying'), or simply "Joker" in American sets.

Suit-restricted 
Vietnamese and Thai mahjong are related to extinct Chinese variants which used specialized jokers such as "King Mahjong" (王麻雀). Vietnamese mahjong sets commonly contain eight unique jokers:
Blue/green jokers (khung xanh):
Circle joker (筒, thùng)
Bamboo joker (索, soọc)
Character joker (萬, màn)
Universal joker (縂, tổng) : In King Mahjong it is a Suit and Honor joker, in Vietnamese mahjong it can also be used like the flower joker. Hong Kongers may use the 皇 character but this is not found in Vietnam because a flower quartet also uses it (see above). or 
Red jokers (khung đỏ):
Suit joker (合, hợp)
Dragon joker (元, nguyên)
Wind joker (喜, hỷ)
Flower joker (花, hoa) : Like an animal tile but scores two doubles; it replaced the King Mahjong joker that functioned as a second Suit and Honor joker (陞王).
Honor joker (番 or 字 or 元喜, nhị khẩu) : A newer Vietnamese tile, it is an alternative to the dragon or wind joker. In Hong Kong, it is an alternative to the flower joker.

The first four jokers have a long lineage. They are found in the earliest sets and were inspired by the suit-restricted jokers in older Chinese card games. After 1975, modern Vietnamese sets triplicated or quadruplicated all eight jokers but each copy will have a different frame (rectangle, circle, lozenge, and hexagon) which allows them to be melded with each other. This means a total of 32 jokers, 36 if the alternate honor jokers are also included.

Rank-restricted 

In Hong Kong, Vietnamese style sets may also contain rank-restricted jokers, either as alternatives to the flower joker, or in addition to the usual eight:
Terminal joker (么, jyutping: jiu1, 'ace') : Replaces one or nine of any suit
147 joker (仕, si6) : Replaces one, four, or seven of any suit
258 joker (將, zoeng3) : Replaces two, five, or eight of any suit
369 joker (兵, bing1 or 卒, zeot1) : Replaces three, six, or nine of any suit or 

The Chinese characters from the latter three comes from Xiangqi pieces. These sets may have suit, dragon, wind, and rank-restricted jokers adorned with multiple characters representing the tiles they can replace, instead of a single Chinese character.

Comparison

footnotes

Regional design 
Designs of mahjong tiles are different between regions. Here are some examples.

Construction 
Traditionally, Mahjong tiles were made of bone, often backed with bamboo.  Bone tiles are still available but most modern sets are constructed from various plastics such as bakelite, celluloid, nylon and PET (often, recycled PET).  There are a small number of sets that have been made with ivory or jade, but these are exceedingly rare: most sets sold as ivory are in fact made from bone. Regardless of the material used to construct the tiles, the symbols on them are almost always engraved or pressed into the material. Some expert players can determine the face value of their tiles without actually looking at them by feeling these engravings with their fingers.

There are generally two size categories available, the larger mainland-China size and the smaller Taiwanese/Japanese/American size. However, within the former category (Mainland Chinese), 4 sizes have been roughly standardized:

Size 8: 
Size 7.5: 
Size 7: 
Size 6: 

The length to thickness ratio in all of these must be above 1:1.5, so that the tiles can steadily stand upright, since Chinese players use no racks to support their tiles in hand during play.

However, the Japanese tiles set themselves apart within this class by virtue of their thickness, which allows them to stand upright—despite their diminutive overall size. This enables Japanese mahjong players also to dispense with the use of racks (these are pervasive in the American game, in combination with slimmer tiles).

Unicode 

Mahjong tiles were added to the Unicode Standard in April, 2008 with the release of version 5.1.

The Unicode block for mahjong tiles is U+1F000–U+1F02B:

The Red Dragon tile also exists as in a non-emoji form as 🀄︎.

In popular culture 

In the 1977 film Annie Hall, the character Alvy Singer (Woody Allen) jokes during a stand-up comedy routine that his Jewish mother once locked herself in the bathroom and attempted to overdose on Mahjong tiles.

See also
 Mahjong mat

References

External links
 The Mahjong Tile Set

Mahjong
Game equipment